The Greenbrier American Express Championship was a professional golf tournament on the Senior PGA Tour (now PGA Tour Champions). Held from 1985 through 1987 in West Virginia, the 54-hole event was played in July at The Greenbrier resort near White Sulphur Springs.

The inaugural event was played Thursday through Saturday, starting on the Fourth of July. Don January won the first two editions, the second in a sudden-death playoff. Bruce Crampton opened with a 63 and won the final tournament in 1987 by six strokes, tying January's scoring record of 200 (–16).

The PGA Tour returned to the resort in 2010 with its Greenbrier Classic.

Results

All events played at The Greenbrier; playoff in 1986 was won with a par on the first extra hole.

Source:

References

Former PGA Tour Champions events
Golf in West Virginia
The Greenbrier
Recurring sporting events established in 1985
Recurring events disestablished in 1987
1985 establishments in West Virginia
1987 disestablishments in West Virginia